During the 2007–08 English football season, Mansfield Town Football Club competed in Football League Two where they finished in 23rd position with 42 points and were relegated to the Conference Premier.

Final league table

Results
Mansfield Town's score comes first

Legend

Football League Two

FA Cup

League Cup

Football League Trophy

Squad statistics

References
General
Mansfield Town 2007–08 at soccerbase.com (use drop down list to select relevant season)

Specific

2007-08
Mansfield Town